Virbia mentiens is a moth in the family Erebidae. It was described by Francis Walker in 1854. It is found in Venezuela and possibly Costa Rica.

References

Moths described in 1854
mentiens
Arctiinae of South America